David Treuer (born 1970) (Ojibwe) is an American writer, critic and academic. As of 2019, he had published seven books; his work published in 2006 was noted as among the best of the year by several major publications. He published a book of essays in 2006 on Native American fiction that stirred controversy by criticizing major writers of the tradition and concluding, "Native American fiction does not exist."

Interested in language preservation, Treuer and his brother Anton are working on an Ojibwe language grammar.

Early life and education
David Treuer was born in Washington, D.C. His mother, Margaret Seelye, was an Ojibwe who first worked as a nurse. His parents met when his father, Robert Treuer, an Austrian Jewish survivor of the Holocaust, was teaching high school on her reservation. When they were in Washington, his father worked for the federal government and his mother attended law school at Catholic University. They returned to the Leech Lake Reservation, Minnesota, where the young Treuer and his two brothers were raised. Their mother became an Ojibwe tribal court judge.

Treuer attended Princeton University; he graduated in 1992 after writing two senior theses, one in the anthropology department and one in the Princeton Program in Creative Writing. He studied writing at Princeton with the authors Joanna Scott and Paul Muldoon; his thesis advisor in that program was the Nobel Prize-winning author Toni Morrison. 
He received his Ph.D. in anthropology from the University of Michigan in 1999.

Academic career
He has taught English at the University of Minnesota in Minneapolis, and at the University of Wisconsin–Milwaukee. He also taught Creative Writing for a semester at Scripps College in Claremont, California, as the Mary Routt Chair of Writing. In 2010 Treuer moved to the University of Southern California where he is a Professor of Literature and teaches in the Creative Writing & Literature PhD program.

Literary career
Treuer has published stories and essays in Esquire, TriQuarterly, The Washington Post, Los Angeles Times, "The New York Times," "Lucky Peach," The Atlantic, and Slate.com.
 
He published his first novel, Little, in 1995, which features multiple narrators and points of view. His second, The Hiawatha, followed in 1999. It was named for a fleet of trains operated by the Chicago, Milwaukee, St. Paul and Pacific Railroad (and by allusion the epic poem The Song of Hiawatha by Henry Wadsworth Longfellow.) The novel features a Native American family who migrate to Minneapolis in the mid-twentieth century under the federally sponsored urban relocation program. One of two brothers works on the railroad.

In the fall of 2006, Treuer published his third novel, The Translation of Dr Apelles. The Native American professor is presented as a translator who lives alone and works with an unnamed language. He confounds many expectations of Native American characters. Dnitia Smith said that Appelles is "untranslated, a man who cannot make sense of his own history, his personal narrative, perhaps because it falls between two cultures, two languages." Brian Hall wrote, "The hidden theme of his novel is that fiction is all about games, lies and feints, about the heightened pleasure we can derive from a narrative when we recognize that it is artful." Treuer uses a double narrative with allusions to several classical and other Western works to pull the novel (and Native American literature) into the mainstream.

That year Treuer published a book of essays, entitled Native American Fiction: A User's Manual (2006). It was controversial because he challenged the work of major writers and urged readers to see the genre of "Native American Fiction" as closely linked to many other literatures in English, and not as a "cultural artifact" of historic Indian culture. He argues against Native American writing being read as ethnography rather than literature.

He criticized "the precious way that Indians are portrayed in even the most well-meaning books and movies." This analysis included the works of such notable authors as Sherman Alexie, Louise Erdrich, Leslie Marmon Silko or James Welch which he thought sometimes the work perpetuated stereotypes and misrepresenting historic cultures. In sum, he said that "Native American literature hasn't progressed as quickly as it should have beyond cultural stereotypes."

In 2012, Treuer published his fourth work, Rez Life: An Indian's Journey Through Reservation Life, which combines memoir with journalism about reservations. He conveys material of his own experience, as well as examining issues on other reservations, including federal policies and Indian sovereignty, and cronyism in tribal governments.

Revival of Ojibwe
Treuer has a deep interest in the Ojibwe language and culture. He is working with his older brother, Anton Treuer, on a grammar as a way to preserve and extend the language. His brother has been studying it since high school.

Treuer has written that "it's not clear why so many Indian critics and novelists suggest that stories, even great ones, in English by writers whose only language is English are somehow 'Indian stories' that store the kernels of culture." He likens that to believing that long abandoned seeds found in caves can sprout and bear produce. He believes that Native American cultures are threatened if their writers have only English to use as a language; he contends that the tribes need their own languages to perpetuate their cultures.

Awards
2014 NACF Literature Fellowship
Pushcart Prize
1996 Minnesota Book Award for Little (1995)
He has received an NEH Fellowship and a Guggenheim Fellowship.
The Translation of Dr Apelles was named a "Best Book for 2006" by The Washington Post, Minneapolis Star Tribune, Time Out Chicago, and City Pages.

Books
 Little: A Novel (1995)
 
 
 Native American Fiction: A User's Manual Macmillan, 2006, 
 
 Prudence, 2015. Riverhead.

Articles
 "A language too beautiful to lose", Los Angeles Times, Feb. 3, 2008.
 "Return the National Parks to the Tribes", The Atlantic, May 2021.
 "'A Sadness I Can't Carry': The Story Of The Drum", New York Times, Oct. 11, 2021.
 "Portrait of the Coyote as a Young Man", Harper's Magazine,  November 2021.
 "Adrift Between My Parents’ Two Americas", New York Times, July 18, 2022.

See also
List of Native American jurists

References

External links

David Stirrup, Review: "Life after Death in Poverty: David Treuer's 'Little'", American Indian Quarterly (29:4 2005).
Douglas Robinson, Review: The Translation of Dr. Apelles: A Love Story – by David Treuer, California Literary Review, 24 April 2007
David Treuer, Essay: "A Language Too Beautiful to Lose", Los Angeles Times, 3 February 2008

1970 births
Living people
Native American writers
Ojibwe people
Writers from Washington, D.C.
Writers from Minnesota
University of Michigan alumni